The Queen Elizabeth can refer to:

  (for several ships of that name) 
 
 
 Queen Elizabeth Hotel